Francis Marotte is a Canadian ice hockey goaltender. He was an All-American for Clarkson.

Playing career
Marotte began his college career with Robert Morris in 2016. He became the team's starter as a freshman and was one of the top goaltenders in the nation. Marotte remained the team's primary goaltender for the next two seasons but as the team's play declined, so did his numbers. Marotte graduated from Robert Morris University after just three years and was able to use the graduate transfer rules to join the ice hockey team at Clarkson without having to sit out a season. For his final season of college hockey, Marotte had a tremendous performance, setting several program records for Clarkson and was named an All-American. Unfortunately for Marotte, the COVID-19 pandemic ended the entire college ice hockey season prematurely, with the Golden Knights all but guaranteed an appearance in the NCAA Tournament.

After wrapping up his college career, Marotte signed a professional contract with the New York Islanders and was assigned to minor league system. He was limited to a small number of appearances in his first pro season due to the pandemic, but he did perform well at the ECHL level. 

After spells with Allen Americans and San Diego Gulls, Marotte joined UK EIHL side Dundee Stars in October 2022. He left Dundee in November 2022.

Career statistics

Awards and honors

References

External links

1995 births
Living people
Canadian ice hockey goaltenders
Ice hockey people from Quebec
Sportspeople from Longueuil
AHCA Division I men's ice hockey All-Americans
Cowichan Valley Capitals players
Robert Morris Colonials men's ice hockey players
Clarkson Golden Knights men's ice hockey players
Bridgeport Sound Tigers players
Allen Americans players
San Diego Gulls (AHL) players
Dundee Stars players
Canadian expatriate ice hockey players in the United States
Canadian expatriate ice hockey players in Scotland